Pavel Parfeni (born 30 May 1986), known professionally as Pasha Parfeny, is a Moldovan musician, singer and songwriter.  He represented Moldova at the Eurovision Song Contest 2012 in Baku, Azerbaijan, where he placed 11th with his song "Lăutar". He was formerly known for being the lead singer of the Moldovan band SunStroke Project. He is set to represent Moldova again in the Eurovision Song Contest 2023 with the song "Soarele și luna".

Biography
Born in Orhei, Parfeny had been surrounded by music from a young age. His mother was a piano teacher at the local music school, while his father was a singer and a guitarist.

While in Orhei, he studied piano from a young age, and in 2002 enrolled at Tiraspol Music College, where he gained more vocal experience. In 2006, Parfeny continued his musical studies at the State Academy of Music, Theatre and Fine Arts.

Musical career

SunStroke Project
In 2008, Parfeny met and joined the creators of the band SunStroke Project, Anton Ragoza and Sergey Stepanov, who were in need of a vocalist. In 2009, the band entered Moldova's national selection contest for the Eurovision Song Contest 2009, where they placed third with their song "No Crime", which Parfeny wrote and composed. In the same year, he left SunStroke Project to pursue a solo career after his contract's expiration, being replaced by Sergei Yalovitsky.

Contests
As a solo artist, Parfeny has participated and won in numerous competitions and music festivals. He won first place out of 23 performers in the George Grigoriu International Pop Music Festival in May 2009, the grand prize of which was a Volkswagen Passat. A few months later, in July, he placed second in the 2009 Slavianski Bazaar with the songs "Svecia Gorela", "Dac-ai Fi", and "We Are The Champions". While he lost to Russian contestant Dima Danilenko, he won a cash prize that was equivalent to 6000 USD. In the same year, he participated in the Mamaia Contest in Romania, taking first place with "You Do Not See The Sky", composed by Andrew Tudor. He also entered but did not win in the 2009 Golden Stag Festival.

Eurovision Song Contest
In 2010, Parfeny again entered the Moldovan national selection for the Eurovision Song Contest, but this time as a solo artist. He tied in second with his song, "You Should Like", which was defeated by his former band SunStroke Project's collaboration with Olia Tira.

The next year, in 2011, he once again failed to get the Moldovan delegation to the Eurovision Song Contest, placing third in the national selection with his song "Dorule".

Parfeny finally won the Moldovan national selection in 2012, representing the country in that year's Eurovision Song Contest. The song, "Lăutar", was written by Parfeny and composed in a collaboration with Alex Brașoveanu, placing 5th in the first semi-final, and 11th in the final.

For the Eurovision Song Contest 2013 in Malmö, Parfeny composed together with Yuliana Scutari and Serghei Legheida the song "A Million" for Aliona Moon in the Moldovan national selection. Moon was one of his backup singers for "Lăutar" in 2012. The song won and represented Moldova in the contest, with Parfeny accompanying Moon on stage at the piano. It ranked fourth in the first semi-final, and again 11th in the final. In 2015, he composed the song "Maricica" for DoReDoS, which placed sixth in the Moldovan national selection.

In 2020, he competed in the Moldovan national selection again with the song, "My Wine" composed in collaboration with Vica Demici. This time he finished second behind Natalia Gordienko.

In 2023, he entered the new Moldovan national final Etapa Națională with the song "Soarele și luna" written together with Yuliana Scutari. He qualified from the auditions stages making it to the final on 4 March. He then won the contest by winning both the jury vote and the public vote, and as a result will represent Moldova in the Eurovision Song Contest 2023 in Liverpool. This will be his third appearance at the contest for Moldova.

References

External links
 Official Facebook page

1986 births
Living people
21st-century Moldovan male singers
Eurovision Song Contest entrants for Moldova
Eurovision Song Contest entrants of 2012
Eurovision Song Contest entrants of 2023
People from Orhei
The Voice of Ukraine contestants